Jaime Serrano Cedillo (1967 – 16 September 2012) was the deputy of Nezahualcóyotl, State of Mexico and a member of the Institutional Revolutionary Party (PRI).

He was assassinated on the afternoon of 16 September 2012, reportedly by his wife, inside his home in Nezahualcóyotl. Serrano Cedillo's assassination came just two days after the slaying of Eduardo Castro Luque, a deputy in the state of Sonora and a member of the PRI. Unlike other political assassinations in Mexico, Serrano Cedillo's death did not bore the signs of organized crime, and was a result of "a series of deep" marital problems.

Career and early life
Born in 1967, Serrano Cedillo was a close collaborator of the State of Mexico's current governor, Eruviel Ávila Villegas.

Prior to his deputy nomination, Serrano Cedillo was the president of the Institutional Revolutionary Party (PRI) in the municipality of Nezahualcóyotl and a former mayoral candidate for the same locality. He had also served as the Sub-secretary of the Interior in Greater Mexico City until May 2011.

On 5 September 2012, Serrano Cedillo was sworn in as deputy for the XXV District of Nezahualcóyotl.

Assassination
Initial reports indicate that Serrano Cedillo left his house to buy a newspaper at a nearby booth and was stabbed in the chest by someone with a sharp weapon. Serrano Cedillo was reportedly coming out of a public restroom when the attacker surprised him. The assailant then managed to flee the scene and no arrests have been made. Serrano Cedillo, on the other hand, made his way home and was transported to a nearby hospital by his family where he was later pronounced dead. The Mexican authorities indicated on 20 September 2012 that Serrano Cedillo's wife, Patricia Grimaldo de la Cruz, reportedly assassinated her husband after having a dispute that same morning for "profound series of conjugal differences." It was later proven that the assassination happened inside Serrano Cedillo's house and not outside his domicile, as previously stated. Unlike other political assassinations, Serrano Cedillo's death did not bore the signs of organized crime. Mexico's drug gangs typically target local leaders and police chiefs, not federal deputies. Moreover, stabbing is not typically a method Mexico's drug trafficking use to do their "dirty work," hinting the officials that the deputy's death was a personal attack.

He was the second PRI politician killed in just two days; Eduardo Castro Luque, a deputy-elect of the state of Sonora, was shot dead by unknown assailants on 14 September 2012. In August 2012, Édgar Morales Pérez of the PRI was also shot and killed by gunmen.

Funeral
After the Municipal Committee of the PRI paid tribute to the fallen Serrano Cedillo on 17 September 2012, he was buried in Jardines de Oriente cemetery.

Aftermath
The Mexican government deployed more than 1,000 troops to Nezahualcóyotl as a response to the assassination of Serrano Cedillo under a military-led program called Operation Neza. This was the first time since the start of Mexico's drug war in 2006 that soldiers have been deployed at this scale near the nation's capital. In Nezahualcóyotl, a city with around 1.1 million people and part of the Mexico City's metropolitan area, is home to a turf war between Los Zetas and La Familia Michoacana, two drug trafficking organizations that fight for the growing drug market and illegal goods in the region.

The troops were finally relocated from Nezahualcóyotl on 3 November 2012 after Operation Neza concluded.

See also
Mexican Drug War
List of politicians killed in the Mexican Drug War

References

External links
Jaime Serrano Cedillo on Facebook
Two PRI politicians killed within days in Mexico (archive) — Los Angeles Times
   — Milenio (Video)

2012 deaths
Deaths by stabbing in Mexico
Institutional Revolutionary Party politicians
Mariticides
Mexican murder victims
Assassinated Mexican politicians
Politicians from the State of Mexico
People from Nezahualcóyotl
1967 births
2012 murders in Mexico